The Tale of the Tape is the debut studio album by American rock musician Billy Squier. It was his first solo album, following two albums with the band Piper. Despite not being a huge success, the disc spent three months on Billboards album chart and helped to kickstart Squier's solo career.

Although no songs from the album reached the charts, the song "The Big Beat" has been notably sampled by hip hop artists, including Run-D.M.C.'s "Here We Go", Big Daddy Kane's "Ain't No Half Steppin'", Jay-Z's "99 Problems", Dizzee Rascal's "Fix Up, Look Sharp", U.T.F.O's "Roxanne, Roxanne" and Alicia Keys' "Girl on Fire". The song also featured a pre-MTV music video.

Critical reception 

In a May 10, 1980 Billboard review, the writer expressed a hope that Billy Squier would be able to realize his potential with this album, which he did not fulfill with Piper.  It quantified that it "fits nicely in a set with Journey and Styx."

Track listing

Personnel 
 Billy Squier - Vocals, Guitar, Percussion
 Bruce Kulick - Guitar
 David Sancious - Keyboards, Synthesizers
 Richard T. Bear - Keyboards
 Bucky Ballard - Bass
 Bobby Chouinard - Drums
 Ernest Carter - Percussion
 Woodstock Children's Chorus - Ellen Todd, Conductor

Production
Produced by Billy Squier & Eddie Offord
Engineered and mixed by Eddy Offord & Rob Davis
Mastered by Wally Traugott
All songs published by Songs Of The Knight (BMI), except "Who's Your Boyfriend" (Songs Of The Knight/Bomass Music Corp.), "Who Knows What A Love Can Do" (Songs Of The Knight/Hostel Music), and "You Should Be High, Love" (Songs Of The Knight/Desmobile Music Company).

References

1980 debut albums
Billy Squier albums
Albums produced by Eddy Offord
Capitol Records albums